The RCD Cup 1965 was the first edition of the RCD Cup tournament, held in Tehran, Iran in 1965. This was a three nation tournament played in league format between Iran, Pakistan and Turkey.

Venue

Results

Rematch
As the game between Iran and Turkey was abandoned on minute 85 of the match due to broken stadium light, a rematch was organised the following year.

Top scorers
2 Goals
 Homayoun Behzadi
 Ogun Altiparmak

Squads

Iran

Head coach:   Hossein Fekri

Pakistan

Turkey

Head coach:  Doğan Andaç 1965

Head coach:  Sandro Puppo 1966

References

RSSSF Page on RCD Cup tournament
TeamMelli.com page for squad list
NationalFootballTeams
Turkish Football Federation
TURKFUTBLU

1965
1965
1965 in Asian football
1965–66 in Turkish football
1965–66 in Iranian football
1965 in Pakistani sport